KF-26777 is a drug which acts as a potent and selective antagonist for the adenosine A3 receptor, with sub-nanomolar affinity (A3 Ki=0.2nM) and high selectivity over the other three adenosine receptor subtypes. Simple xanthine derivatives such as caffeine and DPCPX have generally low affinity for the A3 subtype and must be extended by expanding the ring system and adding an aromatic group to give high A3 affinity and selectivity.

References

Purines
Lactams
Bromoarenes
Adenosine receptor antagonists